Kak Commune may refer to:
 Kak Commune, Basedth District, a commune in Basedth District, Cambodia
 Kak Commune, Bar Kaev District, a commune in Bar Kaev District, Cambodia